The Honda VTR1000F (frame designation "SC36") was a 90° V-twin sport bike produced by Honda from 1997 to 2005. Known worldwide as the Firestorm, in the USA it was marketed as the SuperHawk.

In 2005, the VTR1000F was discontinued.

Innovation 

The VTR1000F was introduced in 1997 using an all new 90-degree V-twin engine and a HMAS (Honda Multi-Action System) fork and shock. The bike also ushered in several new design concepts for Honda such as the semi-pivotless frame, where the engine is a stressed member with the swingarm bolted directly to it. Other innovations were side radiators, single-casting engine case, connecting rods with cap screws instead of nuts, and 38 mm intake valves, the largest Honda has ever used on a production motor at that time. It had the largest carburetors ever put on a production motorcycle (48 mm). In order to overcome response irregularities typical for larger V-twin engines, Honda figured out different camshaft profiles and intake manifold dimensions for the two cylinders, and the power control of the engine was praised in motorbike surveys. Cycle World list a quarter-mile time and speed of 11.03-second/124.26-mph.

Model history 

In 1999, the VTR1000F featured new silver wheels.

From model year 2001, Honda introduced a number of upgrades. These included increasing the tank from  16 liters (4.23 US gallons) to 19 liters (5.02 US gallons), internal modifications to the front forks, black wheels, smaller indicators, and a less extreme riding position (thanks to mildly raked clip-on bars). A new LCD dash display comprised fuel level, engine temperature, dual trip mileometers, odometer and clock. A Honda Ignition Security System (HISS) immobiliser also became standard. The US model "Superhawk" never received the larger tank, instead retaining the original 16 liter (4.2 US gallons).

References

External links 

   

VTR1000F
Sport bikes
Motorcycles introduced in 1997